Johann Lukas Schönlein (30 November 1793 – 23 January 1864) was a German naturalist, and professor of medicine, born in Bamberg.  He studied medicine at Landshut, Jena, Göttingen, and Würzburg.  After teaching at Würzburg and Zurich, he was called to Berlin in 1839, where he taught therapeutics and pathology.
He served as physician to Frederick William IV.

Work
He was one of the first German medical professors to lecture in the native tongue instead of Latin.  Schönlein described purpura rheumatica (Schönlein's disease) an allergic non-thrombopenic purpura rash that became known as Henoch–Schönlein purpura, though now known as IgA vasculitis.
He also discovered the parasitic cause of ringworm or favus (Trichophyton schönleinii).

J. L. Schönlein first published the name "tuberculosis" (German:  Tuberkulose) in 1832. Prior to Schönlein's designation, tuberculosis had been called "consumption".

Taxon named in his honor 
The blackspot tuskfish (Choerodon schoenleinii) is a wrasse native to the Indian Ocean and the western Pacific Ocean from Mauritius to Indonesia and Australia north to the Ryukyus.

See also 
German inventors and discoverers

Notes

Further reading 

 Joh. Lucas Schoenlein von der Hirnmetamorphose, Inauguralabhandlung, Würzburg, Gedruckt bey F. E. Nitribitt, Universitätsbuchdrucker, 1816
 Theses ex universa Medicina. Quas Gratiosi in Inclyta Universitate Herbipolitana Medicorum Ordinis consensu pro Gradu Doctoris in Medicina, Chirurgia et Arte Obstetricia Rite Obtinendo Pubice, Defendet Die XXIV. Februarii MDCCCXVI. Horis Matutinis Consuetis Joannes Lucas Schoenlein, Bambergensis, Wirceburgi 1816 (Thesenverteidigung Schönleins im Jahre 1816)
Allgemeine und spezielle Pathologie und Therapie, Nach J. L. Schönlein's Vorlesungen, Niedergeschrieben und herausgegeben von einem seiner Zuhörer, In vier Bänden, Würzburg 1832 (unrechtmäßiger Vordruck), mit späterer Auflage Herisau 1834
 Dr. J. L. Schönlein's, Professors in Berlin, Krankheitsfamilie der Typhen., Nach dessen neuesten Vorlesungen niedergeschrieben und herausgegeben von einem seiner Zuhörer, Zürich 1840
 Schoenlein's klinische Vorträge in dem Charité-Krankenhause zu Berlin. Redigirt und herausgegeben von Dr. L. Güterbock, Berlin 1842 (Zweite unveränderte Auflage)
 Günter Klemmt: Johann Lukas Schönleins unveröffentlichtes Vorlesungsmanuskript über den "Keichhusten". Matthiesen Verlag, Husum 1986 (Abhandlungen zur Geschichte der Medizin und der Naturwissenschaften 53), 
 K.-P. Kelber, M. Okrusch: (2006): Die geologische Erforschung und Kartierung des Würzburger Stadtgebietes von den Anfängen bis 1925 in Mainfränkische Hefte Würzburg Nr. 105, Seite 71–115
 R. Virchow: Gedächtnisrede auf Joh. Lucas Schönlein, gehalten am 23. Januar 1865, dem ersten Jahrestage seines Todes in der Aula der Berliner Universität.- Berlin 1865
 "... und ewig erklingen wird sein Ruhm ..." – Johann Lukas Schönlein (1793–1864), Katalog einer Ausstellung der Staatsbibliothek Bamberg, Bamberg 1993
 Arnholdt, Robert, Johann Lukas Schönlein als Tuberkulosearzt, In: Bayerisches Ärzteblatt 1978, S. 702–707
 Fuhrmann, H. R.: Dr. Johann Lukas Schönlein, der Begründer einer neuen Zeit un der Medizin, In: Berichte der Phys.-med. Gesellschaft zu Würzburg, 1938, S. 130–179
 Herd, Rudolf: Dr. Johann Lukas Schönleins (1793–1864) fränkische Vorfahren und Verwandte, In: Bericht des Historischen Vereins Bamberg 100 (1964), S. 551–557
 Katalog der Sammlung Schoenlein. Catalog of the Schonleiniana Collection Universitätsbibliothek Würzburg, Boston/Mass. 1972
 Virchow, Gedächtnisrede auf Schönlein, (1865)

External links 
 Neurotree: Johann Lukas Schönlein Details
 Digital collection about Johann Lukas Schönlein at the Bamberg State Library

German pathologists
19th-century German botanists
1793 births
1864 deaths
People from Bamberg
Recipients of the Pour le Mérite (civil class)
Physicians of the Charité